The Sunday Woman is a 1975 Italian thriller film directed by Luigi Comencini. It is based on the novel of the same name by Carlo Fruttero and Franco Lucentini. Set in Turin and starring Marcello Mastroianni, Jacqueline Bisset, and Jean-Louis Trintignant, the story covers the murders of two marginal individuals who had associated with the city's élite.

Plot
Inspector Santamaria is assigned to investigate the murder of the failed architect Garrone, a louche character existing on the fringes of polite society, who has been battered to death with a stone phallus. The servants of the noblewoman Anna Carla Dosio, who she has just sacked, arrive at the police station with the discarded draft of a letter she had written to her friend Massimo Campi, which says that they are going to get rid of Garrone. The wealthy Campi has a secret lover, a young clerk called Lello Riviera who works in the city's planning department, and Santamaria has the young man followed. It emerges that Garrone was acting for the widow Ines Tabusso, who lives in a crumbling villa set in overgrown grounds that are a haunt of prostitutes. If he could wangle planning permission for development, she would make a fortune. 

The Inspector is warned by his boss to move with care now that rich and influential people are involved. All his suspects have motives for eliminating Garrone and none have solid alibis for the time of his death. While Campi withholds co-operation, to protect his homosexuality, Anna Carla enthusiastically assists Santamaria and promises him a secret rendezvous, beginning with lunch. Hoping to win the co-operation of Ines, he mounts a night raid to clear her grounds of prostitutes.

By coincidence, all the characters for different reasons go to the Balon, the city's flea market, where Riviera is battered to death with a stone pestle. The culprit is Ines, who discovered that he was aware of her illicit planning application. She had also killed Garrone when he doubled his price for his crooked work on her behalf. With the case solved, Santamaria and Anna Carla are able to enjoy the private lunch they have promised each other. Their happy afternoon ends when she has to get out of bed to start packing for the family holidays.

Cast
 Marcello Mastroianni as Commissioner Salvatore Santamaria
 Jacqueline Bisset as Anna Carla Dosio
 Jean-Louis Trintignant as Massimo Campi
 Aldo Reggiani as Lello Riviera
 Maria Teresa Albani as Virginia Tabusso
 Omero Antonutti as Benito
 Gigi Ballista as Vollero
 Fortunato Cecilia as Nicosia (as Renato Cecilia)
 Claudio Gora as Garrone
 Franco Nebbia as Bonetto
 Lina Volonghi as Ines Tabusso
 Pino Caruso as De Palma
 Mario Ferrero as Vittorio Dosio
 Giuseppe Anatrelli as Commissario
 Antonio Orlando as Salvatore

References

External links

1975 films
1970s Italian-language films
1970s thriller films
Films set in Turin
Films directed by Luigi Comencini
Films scored by Ennio Morricone
Films with screenplays by Age & Scarpelli
Italian thriller films
20th Century Fox films
Films based on Italian novels
1970s Italian films